The SPC-1000 is a Z80-based personal computer produced by Samsung. It was the first computer created by the brand. Developed in South Korea, it features built-in HuBASIC BASIC written by Hudson Soft in Japan. The computer features a 4 MHz processor and 64 KB of RAM.

History
Launched in 1983, the SPC-1000 was the first personal computer produced by Samsung. The machine was mainly used in education.

Description

The main unit included the keyboard and a built-in tape recorder. External disk drives, a gamepad, and a dedicated CRT monitor could be connected to this unit. It shipped with a user manual on how to use the computer. The computer was capable of running CP/M if equipped with double-side, double density floppy disk drives.

Software was available on cassette tapes, with more than one hundred titles released, between games and programs. Some games were conversions of popular Arcade games in the early 1980s, but adapted to the computer limitations.

Features
The computer uses a Zilog Z80 CPU running at 4 MHz, and offers 64KB of RAM. Sounds is produced by a General Instrument AY-3-8910 chip, providing 3 voices with 8 octaves each. 
Video is generated by an AMI S68047 chip (quite similar to the Motorola 6847), offering semigraphics in 9 colors, a 128 x 192 mode in 4 colors, or a 256 x 192 mode in 2 colors.

Gallery

References

Microcomputers
Products introduced in 1983
Personal computers
Z80-based home computers
Samsung computers